The name Asiang has been used to name 10 tropical cyclones in the Philippine Area of Responsibility by PAGASA in the Western Pacific Ocean.

Typhoon Tess (1964) (T6401, 01W, Asiang), Category 2 typhoon; did not make landfall
Tropical Storm Asiang (1968)
Typhoon Kit (1972) (T7201, 01W, Asiang), strong storm that killed 204 people in the Philippines and caused US$23 million in damages
Typhoon Kathy (1976) (T7601, 01W, Asiang)
Tropical Depression Asiang (1980)
Tropical Storm Wynne (1984) (T8402, 02W, Asiang), passed by the southern coast of Taiwan; led to flooding in Luzon; made landfall in China near the Luichow Peninsula
Typhoon Roy (1988) (T8801, 01W, Asiang), caused widespread damage on Guam and on Rota in the Mariana Islands; at its peak, sustained winds reached 
Typhoon Bobbie (1992) (T9203, 02W, Asiang), struck southeast Japan, damage reached 371.8 million yen ($2.9 million)
Tropical Depression Asiang (1996)
Typhoon Damrey (2000) (T0001, 01W, Asiang),  strong Category 5 super typhoon; did not make landfall

After the 2000 season PAGASA revised their naming lists and the name Asiang was excluded.

Pacific typhoon set index articles